Sarah Grace Wilhite Parsons (born July 30, 1995) is an American professional volleyball player who plays as an outside hitter for Japan professional club NEC Red Rockets and the United States women's national volleyball team.

Personal life

Wilhite Parsons is from Eden Prairie, Minnesota and attended Eden Prairie High School. She was the Minnesota Gatorade Player of the Year in 2011 and 2012 and was the number 14 nationally ranked recruit coming out of high school.

She is married to Jameson Parsons.

Career

College

Wilhite Parsons played college volleyball for Minnesota. In her sophomore season in 2014, she was 2nd on the team in kills with 309 kills. During her junior season in 2015, she trained with the US Collegiate National Team. During that year, she helped Minnesota to its first NCAA Final Four appearance since 2009 in 2015. 

Head coach Hugh McCutcheon stated that it was her junior season when he saw real potential in her to become the team leader as a six-rotation outside hitter. With having won no major awards her entire career, she had a breakout season during her final season in 2016. She worked on her all-around volleyball skills and ended up averaging 4.20 kills per set and helped Minnesota to its second straight NCAA Final Four appearance in 2016. Her season performance garnered her multiple awards such as the AVCA and ESPNW National Player of the Year, becoming the first player in Minnesota's history to receive the award. She was also named the Big Ten Player of the Year. She was named Minnesota's Female Athlete of the Year and Breakthrough Athlete of the Year in 2017. She finished her career with 1,182 kills.

National team

Wilhite Parsons has participated in several tournaments with the U.S. national team including the 2017 Pan-American Cup, 2017 FIVB World Grand Prix, 2018 Pan-American Cup, 2018 FIVB World Championship, and preliminary rounds during the FIVB Nations League in 2018, 2019, 2021, and 2022.

She was named an alternate for the 2020 Olympic Games, but did not travel with the team to Tokyo.

Professional clubs

  Busto (2017–2018)
  Allianz MTV Stuttgart (2018–2019)
  Sesi Vôlei Bauru (2019–2020)
  NEC Red Rockets (2020–)

Awards and honors

Clubs

 2021–2022 Empress' Cup All Japan Volleyball Championship –  Bronze Medal, with NEC Red Rockets
 2021–2022 Kurowashiki Tournament –  Bronze Medal, with NEC Red Rockets
 2019–2020 Brazilian Cup –  Bronze Medal, with Sesi Vôlei Bauru
 2019–2020 Paulista Championship –  Bronze Medal, with Sesi Vôlei Bauru
 2018–2019 German Bundesliga –  Gold Medal, with Allianz MTV Stuttgart
 2018–2019 German Cup –  Silver Medal, with Allianz MTV Stuttgart
 2017–2018 Italian Cup –  Bronze Medal, with Busto

College

AVCA First Team All-American (2016)
ESPNW National Player of the Year (2016)
Big Ten Player of the Year (2016)

International

2019 NORCECA Champions Cup – Most Valuable Player

External links

Team USA profile

References

1995 births
Living people
Sportspeople from Minnesota
People from Eden Prairie, Minnesota
Outside hitters
American women's volleyball players
Minnesota Golden Gophers women's volleyball players
American expatriate sportspeople in Germany
American expatriate sportspeople in Italy
American expatriate sportspeople in Brazil
American expatriate sportspeople in Japan
Expatriate volleyball players in Germany
Expatriate volleyball players in Italy
Expatriate volleyball players in Brazil
Expatriate volleyball players in Japan
Serie A1 (women's volleyball) players